ZieherSmith is a New York City contemporary art gallery run by Andrea Smith Zieher and Scott Zieher.

Gallery exhibitions have been widely reviewed, including shows by artists Tucker Nichols, Rachel Owens, Rachel Rossin, Christoph Ruckäberle, Allison Schulnik, Lauren Silva, Paul Anthony Smith, and Mike Womack. From 2014 to 2016, the gallery conducted business as Zieher Smith & Horton during a temporary collaboration with Horton Gallery. The gallery was among the first to show several notable artists including Eddie Martinez, Corin Sworn, and Wes Lang.

References

External links 
 

Art galleries established in 2014
Art museums and galleries in New York (state)